Jan B. Brzeski is the Managing Director and Chief Investment Officer of Crosswind Financial and Arixa Capital Advisors, LLC, a private real estate investment advisor in Los Angeles that he founded in 2006.  He has participated in real estate transactions valued at more than $100 million, including sourcing, structuring, financing and acquiring investment property. He holds a B.A. in Physics from Dartmouth College and an M.A. in Economics (PPE) from Oxford University.

Career
Prior to forming Arixa Capital in 2006, Brzeski was Vice President of Acquisitions at Standard Management Company, a real estate investment and management company founded by Samuel K. Freshman. While at Standard Management, Brzeski's responsibilities included identifying properties to acquire, underwriting, and negotiating to purchase income property and land. Brzeski has purchased properties including shopping centers, industrial projects, agricultural and development land in Los Angeles, Kern, Riverside, San Bernardino, Placer and Yolo Counties in California.

Before joining Standard Management, Brzeski was a successful entrepreneur. He co-founded and was CEO of STV Communications, Inc., a media services businesses that he sold in 2000.

Previously, Brzeski worked at Goldman Sachs as an investment banking analyst where he contributed to initial public offerings, secondary stock and bond offerings, as well as mergers and acquisitions of leading technology companies.

Other Activities
Mr. Brzeski is a past moderator and co-organizer of the UCLA Real Estate Conference and several UCLA Anderson School of Management real estate symposium events. He is also an instructor for UCLA Extension Real Estate Program. His insights into real estate trends and opportunities were featured in the California Real Estate Journal. He is a California licensed real estate broker.

References

External links
 Arixa Capital official website
 

Living people
Year of birth missing (living people)